Amurca is the bitter-tasting, dark-colored, watery sediment that settles out of unfiltered olive oil over time. It is also known as "olive oil lees" in English. Historically, amurca was used for numerous purposes, as first described by Cato the Elder in De Agri Cultura, and later by Pliny the Elder.  Cato mentions its uses as a building material (128), pesticide (91, 92, 96, 98),  herbicide (91, 129), dietary supplement for oxen (103) and trees (36, 93), food preservative (99, 101), as a maintenance product for leather (97), bronze vessel (98), and vases (100), and as a treatment for firewood in order to avoid smoke (130).

References

External links
Cato the Elder on Agriculture
Olives in Antiquity (Smith's Dictionary, 1875)
Forerunners of Pesticides in Classical Greece and Rome

Toxicology
Olive oil